The Marindahl Post Office, located northwest of Volin, South Dakota, was built around 1870.  It was listed on the National Register of Historic Places in 1980.

It is a one-and-a-half-story log building.  It was the first non-military post office in South Dakota.  It was built by Christian
Marindahl.  It served as a gathering and meeting place as well as a post office.

References

Post office buildings on the National Register of Historic Places in South Dakota
National Register of Historic Places in Yankton County, South Dakota
Buildings and structures completed in 1870
Log buildings and structures on the National Register of Historic Places in South Dakota